Piricaudiopsis is a genus of  fungus in the phylum Ascomycota. It is considered incertae sedis or of indeterminate placement within the phylum.

References 

Fungal plant pathogens and diseases
Ascomycota enigmatic taxa
Ascomycota genera